Allomengea is a genus of dwarf spiders that was first described by Embrik Strand in 1912.

Species
 it contains six species:
Allomengea beombawigulensis Namkung, 2002 – Korea
Allomengea coreana (Paik & Yaginuma, 1969) – Korea
Allomengea dentisetis (Grube, 1861) – North America, Russia (Europe to Far East), Kyrgyzstan, China, Mongolia, Japan
Allomengea niyangensis (Hu, 2001) – China
Allomengea scopigera (Grube, 1859) (type) – North America, Europe, Caucasus, Russia (Europe to Far East), Central Asia, Mongolia
Allomengea vidua (L. Koch, 1879) – Canada, Europe, Russia (Europe to Middle Siberia)

See also
 List of Linyphiidae species

References

Araneomorphae genera
Holarctic spiders
Linyphiidae
Spiders of Asia
Taxa named by Embrik Strand